John E. Flint was an historian of Dalhousie University who was known for his work on the history of colonialism in Africa.

Early life
John Edgar Flint was born in Montreal, Canada. He received his advanced education in England, graduating from Cambridge University (MA) and London University (PhD).

Career
Flint was a member of the faculty of Dalhousie University for 27 years. He wrote biographies of George Taubman Goldie, which was a reworking of his PhD thesis, and Cecil Rhodes, and he edited volume five of The Cambridge History of Africa, dealing with the period c.1790 to c.1870.

In 2001, a Festschrift was published in Flint's honour under the title Agency and action in colonial Africa: Essays for John E. Flint.

Family
Flint had a son Richard who was a disability rights campaigner and a daughter Helen who was a novelist and poet. Both died young due to the inherited degenerative condition cerebellar ataxia.

Selected publications
Sir George Goldie and the making of Nigeria. Oxford University Press, Oxford, 1960.
Nigeria and Ghana. Prentice-Hall, Englewood Cliffs, NJ, 1966.
Books on the British Empire and Commonwealth: A guide for students. Oxford University Press, London, 1968.
Perspectives of empire: Essays in British imperial history presented to Gerald Sandford Graham. Prentice Hall Press, 1973. (Editor with Glyndwr Williams) 
Cecil Rhodes. Little Brown, 1974. 
The Cambridge history of Africa Volume 5: From c.1790 to c.1870. Cambridge University Press, Cambridge, 1977. (Editor)

Further reading
Agency and action in colonial Africa: Essays for John E. Flint. Edited by Chris Youé and Tim Stapleton, Palgrave Macmillan, 2001.

References 

Academic staff of the Dalhousie University
Historians of Africa
Academics from Montreal
Alumni of the University of Cambridge
Alumni of the University of London
Historians from Quebec